The 2004 Pacific hurricane season was unusual in that no tropical cyclones of at least tropical storm intensity made landfall, the first such occurrence since 1991. The season was also below-average in terms of named storms and hurricanes, near-average in terms of major hurricanes. The season officially began on May 15 in the eastern Pacific, and on June 1 in the central Pacific; it officially ended in both basins on November 30. These dates conventionally delimit the period during each year when a majority of tropical cyclones form. The season was reflected by an accumulated cyclone energy (ACE) index of 71 units.

Impact throughout the season was minimal and no deaths were recorded. In early August, the remnants of Hurricane Darby aided in localized heavy rainfall in Hawaii, causing minor street and stream flooding; coffee and macadamia trees were damaged as well. In early September, Hurricane Howard resulted in significant flooding across Baja California Peninsula that damaged agricultural land and 393 homes. Large swells also resulted in about 1,000 lifeguard rescues in California. In mid-September, Javier caused three fishermen to go missing and helped alleviate a multi-year drought across the Southwest United States. It produced record rainfall in the state of Wyoming. In mid- to late October, Tropical Storm Lester and Tropical Depression Sixteen-E caused localized flooding; the latter may have produced a tornado near Culiacán, Mexico.

Seasonal forecasts 

In January 2004, the Servicio Meteorológico Nacional (SMN) released their first prediction for tropical cyclone activity throughout the Northeast Pacific. Based on a Neutral El Niño Southern Oscillation (ENSO), a total of 15 named storms, 6 hurricanes, and 3 major hurricanes was forecast. These values were slightly altered in May to 14 named storms, 7 hurricanes, and 2 major hurricanes, and again in August to 13 named storms, 6 hurricanes, and 3 major hurricanes.

On May 17, the National Oceanic and Atmospheric Administration issued its seasonal forecast for the 2004 central Pacific season, predicting four or five tropical cyclones to form or cross into the basin. Likewise to the SMN, near average activity was expected largely as a result of a Neutral ENSO. The organization issued its experimental eastern Pacific outlook on May 21, highlighting a 45 percent change of below-average activity, 45 percent chance of near-average activity, and only a 10 percent chance of above-average activity in the basin. A total of 13 to 15 named storms, 6 to 8 hurricanes, and 2 to 4 major hurricanes was forecast.

Seasonal summary 

Activity was below average throughout the season. Altogether there were 12 named storms, 6 of which became hurricanes, and 3 of those intensified into major hurricanes, compared to the long-term average of 16 named storms, 9 hurricanes, and 3 major hurricanes.

The season's first storm, Agatha, developed on May 22. No tropical cyclones developed during June, below the average of 2 named storms and 1 hurricane, and also the first time since 1969 that the month was cyclone-free. The first hurricane of the season was Celia, which briefly reached Category 1 strength on July 22. It was soon followed by Darby, the first major Hurricane of the season and the first in the Eastern Pacific since Kenna in 2002.

Overall wind energy output was reflected with an ACE index value of 71 units for the season. Although vertical wind shear was near average and ocean temperatures were slightly warmer than average south of Mexico, anomalously cool waters and drier than average air mass existed in the central portions of the eastern Pacific. Anomalously strong mid-level ridging extending from the Atlantic to northern Mexico steered a majority of the season's cyclones toward this inhospitable region and also acted to steer all the system of tropical storm intensity or stronger away from land.

Systems

Tropical Storm Agatha 

A nearly stationary trough stretched from the eastern Pacific into the eastern Caribbean Sea during mid-May. An ill-defined tropical wave crossed Central America on May 17 and interacted with the trough, eventually leading to the formation of a tropical depression at 00:00 UTC on May 22. The newly formed cyclone moved northwest parallel to the coastline of Mexico while steadily organizing in a low wind shear regime, intensifying into Tropical Storm Agatha by 12:00 UTC that day and attaining peak winds of  twelve hours later. Increasingly cool ocean temperatures and a drier air mass caused Agatha to weaken quickly thereafter, and it degenerated into a remnant low by 12:00 UTC on May 24. The post-tropical cyclone drifted aimlessly before dissipating well south of the Baja California Peninsula on May 26.

Tropical Depression Two-E 

A westward-moving tropical wave from Africa crossed Central America into the eastern Pacific in late June, coalescing into a tropical depression at 12:00 UTC on July 2 well southwest of the southern tip of the Baja California Peninsula. Steered westward by low-level flow, the depression failed to organize amid wind shear and cooler sea surface temperatures, instead degenerating into a remnant low at 00:00 UTC on July 4. The post-tropical cyclone dissipated a day later.

Tropical Depression One-C 

Steered westward, the depression failed to intensify due to its quick forward motion despite a seemingly favorable environment, and it quickly dissipated at 00:00 UTC on July 6.

Tropical Storm Blas 

Steered swiftly northwestward around a mid-level ridge over the southwestern United States, the cyclone steadily intensified and reached peak winds of  early on July 13 as a large and robust convective canopy became evident. Blas began a steady weakening trend as it tracked over increasingly cool sea surface temperatures, weakening to a tropical depression at 18:00 UTC on July 14 and degenerating into a large remnant low twelve hours later. The post-tropical cyclone decelerated and curved northeastward, dissipating well west of central Baja California early on July 19.

Hurricane Celia 

Directed west-northwest around a subtropical ridge, the cyclone steadily intensified amongst a favorable environment, becoming Tropical Storm Celia at 12:00 UTC that same day and further strengthening into a Category 1 hurricane on the Saffir–Simpson hurricane wind scale, the season's first, at 00:00 UTC on July 22. After attaining peak winds of  six hours later, an increasingly unfavorable environment began to hinder the system. Celia weakened to a tropical storm at 18:00 UTC on July 22 and eventually degenerated into a remnant low at 00:00 UTC on July 26.

Hurricane Darby 

The system quickly intensified as it curved west-northwest around a subtropical ridge, becoming Tropical Storm Darby at 00:00 UTC on July 27 and strengthening into a Category 1 hurricane early the next day. It weakened to a tropical storm at 12:00 UTC on July 30 and further to a tropical depression a day later as it entered the jurisdiction of the Central Pacific Hurricane Center.

Although Darby produced no impacts to land as a tropical cyclone, its remnant moisture field combined with an upper-level trough over Hawaii to produce an unstable atmosphere. Minor stream flooding was observed on the southeast flank of Mount Haleakalā. Some coffee and macadamia nut trees were damaged.

Tropical Depression Six-E 

Operationally, an area of disturbed weather was thought to have coalesced into a tropical depression at 09:00 UTC on July 29 while located well southwest of the Baja California Peninsula. The depression was only expected to intensify slightly before entering cooler waters and interacting with outflow from nearby Hurricane Darby. By late that evening, however, its presentation on satellite imagery more resembled a trough, and the NHC discontinued advisories. In post-season analysis, the organization determined that the depression did not form until 06:00 UTC on August 1 and lasted but 24 hours.

Tropical Storm Estelle 

The cyclone moved west-northwest following formation, steered around a subtropical ridge. Thereafter, increasing wind shear caused Estelle to a steady weakening trend. At 00:00 UTC on August 23, the cyclone decelerated to a tropical depression while turning west-southwest, and at 18:00 UTC the following day, it further degenerated into a remnant low. The post-tropical cyclone continued on a west-southwest trajectory prior to dissipating south-southeast of the Big Island at 00:00 UTC on August 26.

Hurricane Frank 

A tropical wave, the remnants of Tropical Storm Earl in the Atlantic, crossed into the eastern Pacific in mid-August and steadily organized to become a tropical depression at 06:00 UTC on August 23 well south of the coastline of Mexico. The depression intensified into Tropical Storm Frank six hours later as banding features and central convection increased. Steered northwest within a favorable environment, the cyclone rapidly intensified into a Category 1 hurricane by 18:00 UTC and ultimately attained peak winds of  twelve hours later. Frank steadily weakened thereafter as it entered cooler ocean temperatures, degenerating into a remnant low at 06:00 UTC on August 26. The remnant low drifted southwest before diffusing into a trough well south of the Baja California Peninsula the following day.

Tropical Depression Nine-E 

Steered north-northwest and eventually west, the cyclone failed to intensify further into a tropical storm amid cool sea surface temperatures and southerly wind shear, and it instead degenerated into a remnant low at 18:00 UTC on August 26.

Tropical Storm Georgette 

Increasingly hostile upper-level winds began to impinge on the west-northwest-moving tropical cyclone shortly thereafter, ultimately causing it to degenerate into a remnant low by 18:00 UTC on August 30. The post-tropical cyclone continued its forward course until dissipating early on September 3.

Hurricane Howard 

A westward-moving tropical wave from Africa entered the eastern Pacific in late August, organizing into a tropical depression at 12:00 UTC on August 30 south of the coastline of Mexico. The depression intensified into Tropical Storm Howard twelve hours later and further developed into a hurricane at 06:00 UTC on September 1. Cooler ocean temperatures led to a steady weakening trend thereafter, and Howard degenerated into a remnant low at 18:00 UTC on September 5. The low turned southwest before dissipating over open waters on September 10.

Although the storm remained offshore, the outer bands of the storm produced significant flooding across the Baja California peninsula, which damaged agricultural land and at least 393 homes. Swells reached  along the Baja California coastline and  along the California coastline; about 1,000 lifeguard rescues took place in California due to the waves. Moisture from the storm enhanced rainfall in parts of Arizona, leading to minor accumulations.

Hurricane Isis 

The system tracked west, intensifying into Tropical Storm Isis twelve hours after being designated, but weakening back to a tropical depression early on September 10, amid persistent wind shear. After conducting a clockwise loop, the hurricane entered cooler waters and began to weaken; it degenerated into a remnant low at 18:00 UTC on the next day. The low drifted southwest and then west, before dissipating well east of Hawaii on September 21.

Hurricane Javier 

A tropical wave entered the eastern Pacific in early September, organizing into a tropical depression at 18:00 UTC on September 10 south of the Gulf of Tehuantepec. Under light shear, the depression intensified into Tropical Storm Javier at 12:00 UTC the next morning and into a hurricane at 18:00 UTC on September 12. Cooler waters, strong southwesterly shear, and an eyewall replacement cycle all weakened Javier thereafter; it fell to tropical depression intensity early on September 19 before crossing Baja California and degenerated into a remnant low at 18:00 UTC that day over the Gulf of California. The low crossed the state of Sonora before dissipating over mountainous terrain on September 20.

Three fishermen went missing offshore the coastline due to high surf. As a post-tropical cyclone, the storm's remnant moisture overspread the Southwest United States, alleviating a multi-year drought. The remnants of Javier produced  of rain in Wyoming, cementing its status as the wettest tropical cyclone in the reliable record there.

Tropical Storm Kay 

An area of disturbed weather developed within the ITCZ well southwest of mainland Mexico, coalescing into a tropical depression at 18:00 UTC on October 4. Moderate northerly shear caused core convection to decrease as the system moved west-northwest, resulting in Kay degenerating into a remnant low at 12:00 UTC on October 6 over open ocean. The low-level swirl curved southwestward and dissipated the next day.

Tropical Storm Lester 

An area of disturbed weather south of the Gulf of Tehuantepec organized into a tropical depression at 18:00 UTC on October 11. Steered northwest to west-northwest by a mid-level ridge to its north and a broad cyclonic circulation to its southwest, the depression intensified into Tropical Storm Lester at 18:00 UTC the next day. The system was initially forecast to become a hurricane amid light shear; however, interaction with the coastline of Mexico and the nearby cyclonic circulation instead caused Lester to weaken. Observations from a reconnaissance aircraft indicated the storm degenerated into a trough at 18:00 UTC on October 13.

As the cyclone paralleled the coastline of Mexico, a tropical storm warning was hoisted from Punta Maldonado to Lázaro Cárdenas.

Tropical Depression Sixteen-E 

A tropical wave entered the eastern Pacific in mid-October, interacting with two previous tropical waves that resulted in a large area of disturbed weather. Initially, the cyclone was characterized by a large area of deep convection enhanced from an upper-level trough. This same trough soon imparted strong wind shear, preventing intensification. The depression moved into Sinaloa early that same day and dissipated over the Sierra Madre Occidental at 18:00 UTC on October 26.

The depression produced locally heavy rainfall across western Mexico, resulting in some localized flooding. The remnant mid-level circulation associated with the cyclone interacted with a frontal system to produce strong thunderstorms across the southern Great Plains.

Other systems 
On August 14, the Japan Meteorological Agency had briefly stated that Tropical Storm Malakas had exited the West Pacific basin and entered the Central Pacific basin, as a weakening tropical depression.

Storm names 
The following names were used for named storms that formed in East Pacific in 2004. This is the same list used in the 1998 season. No Pacific hurricane names were retired by the World Meteorological Organization (WMO) Hurricane Committee following the 2004 season, therefore this list was re-used in the 2010 season. Though not retired following the season, 2004's Hurricane Isis would be the last Eastern Pacific tropical cyclone to bear that name. After going unused in 2010, the WMO announced in April 2015 that the name Isis was being removed from the list of hurricane names, having been deemed inappropriate because it had become associated with the Islamic extremist militant group, also known as ISIS. The name Ivette was chosen to replace it beginning in the 2016 season.

For storms that form in the Central Pacific Hurricane Center's area of responsibility, encompassing the area between 140 degrees west and the International Date Line, all names are used in a series of four rotating lists. The next four names that were slated for use in 2004 are shown below, however none of them were used.

Season effects 
This is a table of all the storms that formed in the 2004 Pacific hurricane season. It includes their duration, names, intensities, areas affected, damages, and death totals. Deaths in parentheses are additional and indirect (an example of an indirect death would be a traffic accident), but were still related to that storm. Damage and deaths include totals while the storm was extratropical, a wave, or a low, and all the damage figures are in 2004 USD.

See also 

 List of Pacific hurricanes
 Pacific hurricane season
 Tropical cyclones in 2004
 2004 Atlantic hurricane season
 2004 Pacific typhoon season
 2004 North Indian Ocean cyclone season
 South-West Indian Ocean cyclone seasons: 2003–04, 2004–05
 Australian region cyclone seasons: 2003–04, 2004–05
 South Pacific cyclone seasons: 2003–04, 2004–05

References

External links 

 National Hurricane Center's 2004 Pacific hurricane season archive
 Central Pacific Hurricane Center's 2004 Pacific hurricane season summary

 
Pacific hurricane seasons
2004 Epac